This is a record of France's results at the FIFA World Cup. France was one of the four European teams that participated at the inaugural World Cup in 1930 and have appeared in 16 FIFA World Cups, tied for the sixth most of any country.
The national team is one of eight to have won the FIFA World Cup title and one of only six to have done so more than once.
 
The French team won its first World Cup title in 1998.
The tournament was played on home soil and France defeated Brazil 3–0 in the final match at the Stade de France. The tournament was hosted in France once before in 1938, where France was eliminated by defending champions Italy in the quarter-finals. In 2018, France won the World Cup for the second time, defeating Croatia 4–2 in the final at the Luzhniki Stadium in Russia.

In 2006 and 2022, France finished as runners-up, losing on penalties to Italy (5–3) and Argentina (4–2) after ties after 120 minutes. The team has also finished in third place on two occasions, in 1958 and 1986, and in fourth place once, in 1982.

FIFA World Cup record

By match

Record by opponent

France at the 1998 FIFA World Cup

France vs South Africa (Group C)

France vs Saudi Arabia (Group C)

France vs Denmark (Group C)

France vs Paraguay (round of 16)

Italy vs France (Quarter-final)

France vs Croatia (Semi-final)

Brazil vs France (Final)

The 1998 final was held on 12 July at the Stade de France, Saint-Denis. France defeated holders Brazil 3–0, with two goals from Zinedine Zidane and a stoppage time strike from Emmanuel Petit. The win gave France their first World Cup title, becoming the sixth national team after Uruguay, Italy, England, West Germany and Argentina to win the tournament on their home soil. They also inflicted the heaviest defeat on Brazil since 1930.

The pre-match build up was dominated by the omission of Brazilian striker Ronaldo from the starting lineup only to be reinstated 45 minutes before kick-off. He managed to create the first open chance for Brazil in the 22nd minute, dribbling past defender Thuram before sending a cross out on the left side that goalkeeper Fabien Barthez struggled to hold onto. France however took the lead in the 27th minute after Brazilian defender Roberto Carlos conceded a corner which Zidane scored with a header from the right.
Three minutes before half-time, Zidane scored his second goal of the match, similarly another header from a corner, this time from the left side. The tournament hosts went down to ten men in the 68th minute as Marcel Desailly was sent off for a second bookable offence. Brazil reacted to this by making an attacking substitution and although they applied pressure France sealed the win with a third goal: substitute Patrick Vieira set up his club teammate Petit in a counterattack to shoot low past goalkeeper Cláudio Taffarel.

French president Jacques Chirac was in attendance to congratulate and commiserate the winners and runners-up respectively after the match. Several days after the victory, winning manager Aimé Jacquet announced his resignation from the French team with immediate effect.

France at the 2018 FIFA World Cup

France vs Australia (Group C)

France vs Peru (Group C)

Denmark vs France (Group C)

France vs Argentina (round of 16)

Uruguay vs France (Quarter-final)

France vs Belgium (Semi-final)

France vs Croatia (Final)

The match was played through a minor thunderstorm, which produced several visible lightning strikes. An audience of 78,011 spectators at the Luzhniki Stadium watched the match, including ten heads of state, among them Russian president Vladimir Putin, French president Emmanuel Macron, and Croatian president Kolinda Grabar-Kitarović. The starting line-ups for both teams were identical to those fielded in the semi-finals.

Croatia had the majority of possession and chances early in the first half, with the ball staying mostly in France's half. An attack by French midfielder Antoine Griezmann was stopped by a challenge from Marcelo Brozović, which was called as a foul despite claims that Griezmann dived. Griezmann took the ensuing  free kick, which was diverted by the head of Mario Mandžukić into the left corner of his own net to give France the lead in the 18th minute. It was the first own goal to be scored in a World Cup final and the 12th of the tournament, the most of any World Cup.

Ten minutes later, Croatia equalised with a left-footed strike by Ivan Perišić to the right corner of the net, assisted by Domagoj Vida after a free kick by Luka Modrić on the right. In the 34th minute, a penalty was awarded against Croatia after Perišić's handball in the box from a corner on the right was reviewed by the video assistant referee. Griezmann scored the penalty in the 38th minute with a low finish to the left, giving France a 2–1 lead at half-time; the first half's three goals were the most of any World Cup final since 1974. France led at half-time despite having only one shot on goal and with only 34% of possession.

A Croatian counter-attack was stopped early in the second half after several pitch invaders were chased onto the field by security officers; Russian feminist rock band and protest group Pussy Riot claimed responsibility for the interruption. In the 59th minute, France extended their lead to 3–1 with a left-foot strike to the left of the net from the edge of the penalty area by Paul Pogba after his initial shot had been blocked. Six minutes later, Kylian Mbappé scored France's fourth goal, with a low right-foot shot from outside the box to the left of the net; Mbappé became the first teenager to score in a World Cup final since Pelé in 1958. Croatia scored their second goal in the 69th minute from a back-pass that goalkeeper Hugo Lloris failed to dribble away from Mandžukić, who poked the loose ball into the unguarded net with his right leg. Despite a late push by Croatia, the match finished as a 4–2 victory for France and the highest-scoring World Cup final since 1966. This was the highest-scoring 90-minute World Cup final since 1958.

Most matches played

Goalkeeper Hugo Lloris holds the FIFA World Cup record for most matches played by a goalkeeper.

Goalkeeper Fabien Barthez also shares the FIFA World Cup record for most matches without conceding a goal, which he achieved ten times. The only other player to have reached that number is England's Peter Shilton.

Top goalscorers

Just Fontaine scored all his 13 World Cup goals in 1958, where France reached third place. This makes him record holder for most goals scored in a single FIFA World Cup. At the time, it also made him the most successful World Cup scorer of all time until the record was broken by West Germany's Gerd Müller in the World Cup final of 1974.

References

External links
France at FIFA
Complete France FIFA World Cup Stats

 
Countries at the FIFA World Cup
World Cup